Staðarstaður is a small settlement and parsonage located in Snæfellsnesi, Iceland. It is claimed that Ari Þorgilsson lived there in the 12th century. In 1981 a memorial by Ragnar Kjartansson as a remembrance of this was erected.

References

Snæfellsnes